Carleton Lyons "Bud" Erickson (January 10, 1916 – April 14, 2008) was an American football player.  He played professionally as a center in the National Football League (NFL) for the Washington Redskins.  Erickson played college football at the University of Washington.

References

1916 births
2008 deaths
American football centers
Atlanta Falcons announcers
National Football League announcers
Washington Huskies football players
Washington Redskins players
Players of American football from Seattle